Van den Brink is a Dutch toponymic surname meaning "from the village center". The name is quite common, particularly in the Veluwe region, with 13,185 people in the Netherlands in 2007. People with this surname include:

Van den Brink
 (born 1944), Dutch sculptor
Bas van den Brink (born 1982), Dutch footballer
 (born 1958), Dutch jazz pianist and composer
Dolf van den Brink (born 1973), Dutch CEO of Heineken USA
Eric Van Den Brink, Dutch musician and record producer 
Hans Maarten van den Brink (born 1956), Dutch journalist and writer
Harry van den Brink (born 1961), Dutch military commander
Jan van den Brink (1915-2006), Dutch politician
Jeroen van den Brink (born 1968), Dutch theoretical physicist
Marcel R.M. van den Brink (born 1960), Dutch hematologist 
Marco J.P. van den Brink (born 1970), Dutch garage owner.
Patrick van den Brink (born 1967), Dutch politician
Wim van den Brink (born 1952), Dutch psychiatrist
Bakhuizen van den Brink
 (1896–1987), Dutch theologian
Reinier Cornelis Bakhuizen van den Brink (1881–1945), Dutch botanist
Reinier Cornelis Bakhuizen van den Brink (1911–1987), Dutch botanist

See also
Vandenbrink Design, Dutch car design and coachbuilding company, a.o. of the Vandenbrink GTO
Ten Brink, surname with a similar origin
Brink (surname)

References

Dutch-language surnames
Surnames of Dutch origin